Bavarian B IIIs were steam locomotives of the Royal Bavarian State Railways (Königlich Bayerische Staatsbahn).

Eight examples were delivered by Maffei in 1852; the remainder came from Hartmann. The machines by Hartmann had great similarity to those of the Class A IV, which were manufactured at the same time. Unlike the Hartmann engines, these locomotives also had a steam dome. This was later added to the Hartmann variants. All the engines had a Crampton boiler with smooth tubes and a Kirchweger condenser.

They were equipped with a 3 T 5 tender.

See also 
 Royal Bavarian State Railways
 List of Bavarian locomotives and railbuses

External links 
 Railways of Germany forum

2-4-0 locomotives
B 03
Standard gauge locomotives of Germany
Maffei locomotives
Railway locomotives introduced in 1852
1B n2 locomotives
Sächsische Maschinenfabrik locomotives
Passenger locomotives